Crawl File is the first compilation album of songs released by Australian rock band Australian Crawl. The songs were taken from their first three studio albums The Boys Light Up, Sirocco and Sons of Beaches together with their EP, Semantics. The album was released in November 1984 and then re-released on CD in 1994.

Track listing

Charts

References

Australian Crawl albums
1984 compilation albums
Albums produced by Peter Dawkins (musician)
Albums produced by Mike Chapman
Albums produced by Mark Opitz
EMI Records compilation albums